Asana, Inc. ( or ), is an American software company based in San Francisco whose flagship Asana service is a web and mobile "work management" platform designed to help teams organize, track, and manage their work. Asana, Inc. was founded in 2008 by Dustin Moskovitz and Justin Rosenstein. The product launched commercially in April 2012. In September 2020, the company was valued at $5.5 billion following its direct listing.

History 
The co-founders met at Facebook, where Moskovitz, Facebook's co-founder and vice president of engineering, and his colleague Rosenstein created a productivity tool called Tasks. In 2008, the co-founders left Facebook to start Asana.  Asana officially launched for free out of beta in November 2011 and commercially in April 2012. 

In 2014, Asana launched its native iOS app and in January 2015, Asana released its native Android app. In 2016, Asana raised $50 million in Series C financing led by Sam Altman, President of Y Combinator. In 2017, Asana integrated with Gmail, and launched its app in French and German.

By January 2018, more than 35,000 paying customers were using Asana, including CityFibre, AB-InBev, Viessmann, eBay, Uber, Overstock.com, Navy Federal Credit Union, Icelandair, and IBM. That same year, the company raised $75 million in Series D funding led by Generation Investment Management, a firm backed by Al Gore. In November 2018, Asana raised another $50 million in funding in Series E to invest in international and product expansion.

In March 2018, "Hiten Shah" wrote about the history of Asana as "Asana’s Rise to a $1.5 Billion Valuation".

In September 2020, Asana went public on the New York Stock Exchange via a direct public offering. In August 2021, Asana dual listed on the Long-Term Stock Exchange.

By December 2021, Asana's customer count increased to 114,000 with two million paid seats globally and 739 of these were spending $50,000 or more on an annualized basis.

In April 2022, Asana released its annual Anatomy of Work Index. The report surveyed the behaviors and attitudes of more than 10,000 knowledge workers globally to highlight differences and year-over-year trends in the modern workplace.

Asana and Align Technology announced Asana Smiles for Align in May 2022. This partnership offers Invisalign trained doctors in the U.S. a customizable workflow that helps reduce manual processes and tracks tasks throughout the patient's treatment.

In September 2022, Asana had 131,000 customers, while the number of customers spending over $5,000 annually increased to 18,040, up 41%.

Features 
Asana is a software-as-a-service platform designed for team collaboration and work management. Teams can create projects, assign tasks, set deadlines, and communicate directly within Asana. It also includes reporting tools, file attachments, calendars, and goal tracking. In 2022, Asana released features for team organization; this included My Goals, Automatic Progress Updates, and integrations for Google Workspace and Figma.

API and integrations 
In April 2012, Asana released its API to third-party developers. Asana's open API provided a means to read and input information and create programmed automation within the app. The Asana API is a RESTful interface, allowing users to update and access much of their data on the platform. In April 2021, Asana launched Asana Partners, which allows for cross platform integration with its project management software. In July 2021, Asana launched an app for Zoom. The Asana app can be opened within the video-conferencing software Zoom.

Reception 

Asana twice received a 4.5 out of 5 from PC Magazine. In 2017 it was an Editors' Choice and was called "one of the best collaboration and productivity apps for teams" and went on to note its "thoughtful design, fluid interactive elements, and generous member allotment." In 2020, it received a Best of the Year award, remarking that it "is one of the best apps for managing tasks, workflows, and—yes—certain kinds of projects" despite not being a full-scale project management platform. Asana was also named as one of the Best Workplaces for Parents in the US by Great Place to Work in 2020 and 2021.

In 2021, Inc. named Asana to its annual Best Workplace list and one of the Best Led companies. Fast Company named Asana #15 most innovative companies and added the company to its Brands That Matter list.

See also 
 Collaborative workflow
 Collaborative software - application software designed to help people working on a common task to attain their goals
 List of collaborative software
 Information silo - describes a state in which incapable of reciprocal operation with others that are, or should be, related
 Project management software
 Comparison of project management software(List of project management software)
 Social project management
 Team management

References

External links 
 

Project management software
Collaborative software
Task management software
Mission District, San Francisco
Web applications
Software companies based in the San Francisco Bay Area
2008 establishments in California
Companies based in San Francisco
American companies established in 2008
Software companies established in 2008
Software companies of the United States
Companies listed on the New York Stock Exchange
Direct stock offerings
Workflow applications